Ruthven is a former settlement in Badenoch, in the Highland council area, Scotland. The ruins of the 18th century Ruthven Barracks are nearby, on the site of the earlier Ruthven Castle. James Macpherson, the "translator" of the Ossian poems, was born here in 1736.

See also
Comyn's Road

References
Ruthven, Highland, Gazetteer for Scotland

Populated places in Badenoch and Strathspey